Philippe Périlleux (born 16 September 1963) is a retired French football midfielder.

References

1963 births
Living people
French footballers
Valenciennes FC players
Lille OSC players
Montpellier HSC players
USL Dunkerque players
Association football midfielders
Ligue 1 players